The 2014 USA Indoor Track and Field Championships was held at Albuquerque Convention Center in Albuquerque, New Mexico. Organised by USA Track and Field (USATF), the three-day competition took place February 21–23 in conjunction with the USA Indoor Combined Events Championships which started the day after and served as the national championships in track and field for the United States.

The results of the event determined qualification for the 2014 IAAF World Indoor Championships to be held in Sopot, Poland between 7–9 March 2014 provided the athlete achieved (or will achieve before the cut-off date) the World Championships "A" or "B" standard, the top three athletes can gain a place on the World Championships team in an individual event (although only two can compete). Reigning world champions or Diamond League champions (in events where there is no reigning world champion) received a wild card entry to the World Championships, and they did not count against the maximum number of three athletes per event.

The women's 3000-meter run attracted the most attention within the competition. Gabe Grunewald, who had previously been diagnosed with cancer, won the race by several seconds to take her first national title. A clash between Grunewald and Jordan Hasay (the fourth placer) in the final lap was originally disregarded by the judges. Alberto Salazar, the coach of Hasay and runner-up Shannon Rowbury, filed a protest which was overruled by the track referee, then a subsequent appeal of that decision was again dismissed. Grunewald's coach, Dennis Barker, stated that Nike staff and Salazar continued to apply pressure on the USATF officials, which resulted in the reopening of the appeal and the disqualification of Grunewald hours after the race (in contravention of USATF's own appeal rules). This provoked severe criticism from present athletes and coaches, as well as track and field journalists and fans on social media. As a result, USATF CEO Max Siegel opened discussions with Barker and Salazar which resulted in the withdrawal of Hasay and Grunewald being reinstated as champion on February 24. The affair generated negative publicity for both USATF and Nike, a company whose sponsorship accounted for nearly half the governing body's budget in 2012.

Medal summary

Men

Women

References

Results
2014 USA Indoor Track and Field Championships Results (archived). USA Track and Field. Retrieved on 2014-06-08.

External links
Official USATF website

2014
Track and field indoor
USA Indoor Track and Field Championships
Sports in Albuquerque, New Mexico
Sports competitions in New Mexico
USA Indoor Track and Field Championships
Track and field in New Mexico
USA Indoor Track and Field Championships
Events in Albuquerque, New Mexico